Colonel Walter Katte (November 14, 1830 – March 4, 1917) was a British-born American civil engineer. Katte led design and construction of Eads Bridge at St. Louis, Park Avenue Viaduct, and construction of the Weehawken Tunnel in New Jersey, was Chief Engineer of the New York Central Railroad company, founding member of Western Society of Engineers and one of early members and director of the American Society of Civil Engineers.

Katte was also responsible for construction of railroad stations on Harlem Line: Melrose, Morrisania, Tremont and Fordham station.
Katte was a Colonel of Engineers in the Union Army during the Civil War.
The New York Times called Katte a "famous engineer".

Life and career 
Katte was born in London, England on November 14, 1830, and graduated from King's College London. He immigrated to the United States in 1849. Katte served as Chief Engineer of the New
York Elevated Railroad Company (1877-1886), and then as Chief Engineer of the New York Central Railroad company from 1886 to 1898 until his retirement.

References 

1830 births
1917 deaths
Alumni of King's College London
American civil engineers
Engineers from London